Pelagio Galvani (c. 1165 – 30 January 1230, Portuguese:  Latin: Pelagius) was a Leonese cardinal, and canon lawyer. He became a papal legate and leader of the Fifth Crusade. 

Born at Guimarães, his early life is little known. It is repeatedly claimed that he entered the Order of Saint Benedict but this is not proven. Pope Innocent III created him cardinal-deacon of Santa Lucia in Septisolio around 1206. Later, he was promoted to the rank of cardinal-priest of S. Cecilia (probably on 2 April 1211), and finally opted for the suburbicarian see of Albano in the spring of 1213. He subscribed the papal bulls between 4 May 1207 and 26 January 1230. He was sent on a diplomatic mission to Constantinople in 1213. During this two-year mission he attempted to close Orthodox churches and imprison the clergy, but this caused such domestic upset that Henry of Flanders, the Latin Emperor of Constantinople, reversed his actions which had caused the "tempest which held the city of Constantine in its grip", as noted a contemporary historian. Three years later he was elected Latin Patriarch of Antioch but his election was not ratified by the Holy See. He was dispatched in 1218 by Pope Honorius III to lead the Fifth Crusade at Damietta in Egypt, and made a poor strategic decision in turning down favourable peace offers made by the sultan al-Kamil. During his absence, the see of Albano was administer by Thomas of Capua.

He became dean of the Sacred College of Cardinals at the election to the papacy of Cardinal Ugolino Conti, who became Pope Gregory IX, on 19 March 1227. He was one of the leaders of the papal army in 1229–1230 during the War of the Keys against the Emperor Frederick II. He died at Monte Cassino and was buried there.

References
Akropolites, George (Ruth Macrides, ed). The History. Oxford: University Press, 2007.
Joseph P. Donovan (1950), Pelagius and the Fifth Crusade
Werner Maleczek (1984), Papst und Kardinalskolleg von 1191 bis 1216, Vienna

Araldica Vaticana
Peter Linehan: The Spanish Church and the Papacy in the 13th Century, Ch. 12 (Spaniards at the Curia)

Notes

Canon law jurists
13th-century cardinals
Cardinal-bishops of Albano
13th-century Italian Roman Catholic bishops
Christians of the Fifth Crusade
Deans of the College of Cardinals
1160s births
1230 deaths
Year of birth uncertain
Latin Empire people
13th-century jurists